Corine Pelluchon (born 2 November 1967, Barbezieux-Saint-Hilaire) is a French philosopher and professor of philosophy at the University of Paris-Est Marne-la-Vallée (UPEM).

Education
Corine Pelluchon received her agrégation in philosophy in 1997, then defended a thesis entitled  at the Paris 1 Panthéon-Sorbonne University in 2003, and obtained a habilitation in philosophy entitled  in 2010.

Career and research
She was appointed professor of philosophy at the University of Franche-Comté and in 2016 joined UPEM, where she is a statutory member of the interdisciplinary laboratory for the study of political philosopher, Hannah Arendt.

Pelluchon was invited by the parliamentary commission for the revision of the bioethics laws on 20 January 2009.

Her research interests include applied ethics, medical ethics, animal issues, political ecology and environmental ethics.

Awards and honours
 2006, prix François-Furet
 2012,  for her book, Éléments pour une éthique de la vulnérabilité. Les hommes, les animaux, la nature
 2015,  for her book, Les Nourritures. Philosophie du corps politique
 2016, prix Paris-Liège for the essay, Les Nourritures. Philosophie du corps politique
 2020, prix Günther Anders
 2021, Knight, Legion of Honour

Selected works
 La Flamme ivre, 1999 
 Leo Strauss, une autre raison, d'autres Lumières : essai sur la crise de la rationalité contemporaine, 2005 
 
 La Raison du sensible : entretiens autour de la bioéthique, 2009 
 Éléments pour une éthique de la vulnérabilité : les hommes, les animaux, la nature, 2011 
 Comment va Marianne ? : conte philosophique et républicain, 2012 
 Tu ne tueras point : réflexions sur l'actualité de l'interdit du meurtre, 2013 
 Les Nourritures : philosophie du corps politique, 2015 
 Manifeste animaliste : politiser la cause animale, 2017 
 Éthique de la considération, 2018 
 Pour comprendre Levinas, 2020 
 Réparons le monde. Humains, animaux, nature, 2020 
 Les Lumières à l'âge du vivant, 2021 
 Paul Ricœur, philosophe de la reconstruction : Soin, attestation, justice, 2022  
 L'espérance ou la traversée de l'impossible, 2023

References

1967 births
Living people
People from Charente
21st-century French philosophers
French women philosophers
Academic staff of the University of Franche-Comté
University of Paris-Est Marne-la-Vallée
Chevaliers of the Légion d'honneur